The 2012–13 Armenian Premier League season was the twenty-first since its establishment. The season began on 24 March 2012 and ended on 18 May 2013, with two scheduled breaks between 2–27 July 2012 and 3 December 2012 – 8 March 2013. Ulisses are the defending champions, having won their first league title last season.

The league switched from a year-round to a fall-spring schedule.

The title was won by Shirak.

Competition changes
The league changed its competition mode from that of a calendar year to a fall-spring schedule. As a consequence, this season will be longer than usual; every team will play six times against each other team, three times at home and three times away.

Teams

Because all of the club's in last year's First League competition were reserve teams of the Premier League clubs, there was no promotion or relegation between the two for this season. Therefore, the league membership has not changed from last year's competition.

Personnel and sponsorship

Managerial changes

League table

Results

Season statistics

Top scorers
Updated through matches played on 12 April 2013.

References

External links
 
 soccerway.com
 uefa.com
 rsssf.com

Armenian Premier League seasons
Armenian Premier League
1